John Howard David "Jack" McGaw (May 22, 1936 – October 18, 2012) was a Canadian journalist and radio operator. He was a cohost of the consumer newsmagazine Live It Up! in the early 1980s, and subsequently produced and hosted freelance documentary programming.

In the mid-1990s, McGaw launched a tourist information radio station on Vancouver Island. He subsequently moved to Halifax in 2001, and operated that city's CIRH-FM, and similar stations in the Information Radio network in locations across Canada.

McGaw died of gallbladder cancer on October 18, 2012 in Kitchener, Ontario, at the age of 76.

McGaw's second wife was CBC journalist Ann Medina.

References

External links
 Profile of McGaw's Information Radio in the King's Journalism Review
 Obituary in the Globe and Mail

1936 births
2012 deaths
Canadian television hosts
Canadian radio personalities
People from Saint Boniface, Winnipeg
Deaths from gallbladder cancer
Deaths from cancer in Ontario